Tribe TV is an Indian Santali language television channel. The channel is the India's first santali Satellite television channel owned by Kalyani Solvex Private Limited and the channel's co-founder is Raiganj Vidhan Sabha constituency's MLA Krishna Kalyani.

About 
In 2020, Kalyani Solvex Private Limited setup the channel at Raiganj, West Bengal. Tribe TV broadcasts daily news bulletin and especially one-hour broadcast World topic news. The channel broadcasts live from Delhi.

Availability 
The channel was launched on 9 August 2021 through various satellite and cable platforms. The channel has a wide range of diverse programming, which includes drama, news, and even other kinds of programming.

Popular shows 

 Sagun Setah
 Basiyam Bewra
 Tikin Tarasing
 Khabar Dinbhar
 Santali Special
 Tribe Prime News
 Bengal Xpress
 News at 9
 Reyar Raha Jiyar Raha
 Weekly Special Show
 The Soren Show

Satellite 
Tribe TV channel started on GSAT-10/ GSAT-30 at 83 East

 Channel name:TRIBE TV
 Frequency:3757
 Popularization: H
 Symbol Rate:15000
 Video Pid: 2009
 Audio Pid: Default MPEG PID 3009 Hin
 Service Id: 9
 Satellite Position: GSAT 10 – Gsat 30

See also 

 Lists of television channels in India
 India TV
 Zee News
 Indian Satellite Television Channels

References

External links 

2021 establishments in India
24-hour television news channels in India
Santali language TV channels in India